Clap Your Hands may refer to:

 "Clap Yo' Hands", a 1926 song by George and Ira Gershwin
 "Clap Yo Hands", a 1995 song by Naughty by Nature
Clap Your Hands (1948 film) part of Universal Pictures Sing and Be Happy series
 "Clap Your Hands" (2NE1 song), 2010
 "Clap Your Hands" (Downsyde song), 2003
 "Clap Your Hands" (David Guetta and GlowInTheDark song), 2015
 "Clap Your Hands" (Sia song), 2010
 "Clap Your Hands!", a song by Audio Adrenaline from Until My Heart Caves In
 "Clap Your Hands", a song by The Beau Marks
 "Clap Your Hands!", a song by the Black Eyed Peas from Behind the Front (album)
 "Clap Your Hands!", a song by Clap Your Hands Say Yeah from Clap Your Hands Say Yeah
 "Clap Your Hands!", a song by Lil' Romeo from Game Time
 "Clap Your Hands", a song by LL Cool J from Walking with a Panther
 "Clap Your Hands!", a song by The Manhattan Transfer from The Manhattan Transfer
 "Clap Your Hands", a song by They Might Be Giants from No!
 "Clap Your Hands", a song by A Tribe Called Quest from Midnight Marauders
 "Clap Your Hands", a song by Le Youth featuring Ava Max
 "Clap Your Hands", a children's first grade reader book starring "Foot the Owl" ("Foot" is pronounced rhyming with "boot" or "hoot" in this case), who is actually a walrus that thinks he's an owl. 
 "Clap Your Hands", a 2022 song by Kungs

See also
Clapping, the sound made by striking together two flat surfaces, such as the palms of the hands
Applause, the expression of approval by the act of hand clapping
Clap Your Hands Say Yeah, an American indie rock band